Raymondville is the name of two towns in the United States:

Raymondville, Missouri
Raymondville, Texas